Saulo Estevao da Costa Pimenta (born April 11, 1974) is a former Brazilian football player.

Club statistics

References

External links

1974 births
Living people
Brazilian footballers
Brazilian expatriate footballers
J2 League players
Albirex Niigata players
Expatriate footballers in Japan
Association football forwards